The Episcopal Diocese of Northern California, created in 1910, is the diocese of the Episcopal Church in the United States of America with jurisdiction over the northern part of California. It is in Province 8 and its cathedral, Trinity Episcopal Cathedral, is in Sacramento, as are the diocesan offices.

List of bishops
The bishops of Northern California have been:
 John Henry Ducachet Wingfield, (1874–1898), Missionary Bishop and first diocesan bishop
 William Hall Moreland, Missionary Bishop (1899), second diocesan bishop (1910–1933)Archie W. N. Porter, bishop coadjutor 1933
 Archie W. N. Porter, (1933–1957)Clarence Haden, bishop coadjutor 1957
 Clarence Haden, (1958–1978)Edward McNair, suffragan bishop (1968–1972)
 John L. Thompson, (1978–1991)Jerry A. Lamb, bishop coadjutor 1991
 Jerry A. Lamb, (1992–2006)Barry Leigh Beisner, bishop coadjutor 2006
 Barry Leigh Beisner, (2007–2019)
 Megan M. Traquair, (2019–present)

List of significant parishes

 Faith Episcopal Church, Cameron Park, CA
 St. Michael's Episcipal Church and School Carmichael, CA
 St Martin's Episcopal Church Davis, CA
 Trinity Episcopal Church Folsom, CA
 St John's Episcopal Church Petaluma, CA
 All Saints' Episcopal Church Redding, CA
 St John's Episcopal Church and School Roseville, CA
 Church of the Incarnation Santa Rosa, CA
 St. Stephen's Episcopal Church Sebastopol, CA

See also

 List of Succession of Bishops for the Episcopal Church, USA

References

External links
Episcopal Diocese of Northern California website
Google map of Episcopal churches belonging to Northern California
Trinity Episcopal Cathedral website
Official Web site of the Episcopal Church
Journal of the Annual Convention

Northern California
Diocese of Northern California
Christian organizations established in 1910
1910 establishments in California
Province 8 of the Episcopal Church (United States)